Jo Man-yeong (1776 — 1846) was a Korean politician and court minister of the Joseon Dynasty. He was the leader of the Pungyang Jo clan. The clan rose to prominence, pushing out the Andong Kim clan that had wielded power since the King Sunjo regime. However, with the death of Jo Man-yeong in 1846, control of the kingdom once again fell into the hands of the Andong Kim clan. He was the father of Queen Sinjeong and the maternal grandfather of Heonjong of Joseon. As his daughter posthumously became Queen consort, Jo was then honoured as Internal Prince Pungeun (풍은부원군, 豊恩府院君).

Family
Great-great-great-grandfather
 Jo Do-bo (조도보, 趙道輔)
 Great-great-great-grandmother
 Lady Kim of the Gyeongju Kim clan (본관: 경주 김씨, 金氏); daughter of Kim Pil-jin (김필진, 金必鎭)
 Great-great-grandfather
 Jo Sang-gyeong (조상경, 趙尙絅)
 Great-great-grandmother
 Lady Yi of the Bupyeong Yi clan (본관: 부평 이씨, 李氏); daughter of Yi Jeong-tae (이정태, 李廷泰)
 Great-grandfather
 Jo Eom (조엄, 趙曮) (1719 - 1777); brought sweet potato seeds in 1763, during King Yeongjo's 39th year of reign
 Great-grandmother
 Lady Hong of the Pungsan Hong clan (홍씨, 洪氏) (1717 - 1808);daughter of Hong Hyeon-bo (홍현보, 洪鉉輔)
 Father
 Jo Jin-gwan (1739 - 1808) (조진관, 趙鎭寬)
 Uncle - Jo Jin-ui (조진의, 趙鎭宜)
 Aunt - Lady Jo of the Pungyang Jo clan (본관: 풍양 조씨, 豊壤 趙氏)
 Uncle - Han Yong-jeong (한용정, 韓用鼎) of the Cheongju Han clan
 Aunt - Lady Jo of the Pungyang Jo clan (본관: 풍양 조씨, 豊壤 趙氏)
 Uncle - Hong Byeong-hyeob (홍병협, 洪秉協) of the Namyang Hong clan 
 Mother
 Lady Hong of the Namyang Hong clan (남양 홍씨, 南陽 洪氏) (1739 - 1799); daughter of Hong Ik-bin (홍익빈, 洪益彬)
 Siblings
 Younger brother - Jo Won-yeong (조원영, 趙原永) (1777 - 1825); became the adopted son of his uncle Jo Jin-ui (조진의, 趙鎭宜)
 Sister-in-law - Lady Han (한씨, 韓氏); daughter of Han Yong-gu (한용구, 韓用龜)
 Younger brother - Jo In-yeong (조인영, 趙寅永) (1782 - 1850)
 Sister-in-law - Lady Kim of the (new) Andong Kim clan (신 안동 김씨, 新 安東 金氏); daughter of Kim Se-sun (김세순)
 Niece - Lady Jo of the Pungyang Jo clan (본관: 풍양 조씨, 豊壤 趙氏)
 Nephew-in-law - Kim Hak-seong (김학성, 金學性) of the Cheongpung Kim clan (청풍 김씨, 淸風 金氏)
 Niece - Lady Jo of the Pungyang Jo clan (본관: 풍양 조씨, 豊壤 趙氏)
 Nephew-in-law - Yi In-woo (이인우, 李寅禹) of the Jeonju Yi clan (전주 이씨, 全州 李氏)
 Niece - Lady Jo of the Pungyang Jo clan (본관: 풍양 조씨, 豊壤 趙氏)
 Nephew m-in-law - Seo Ik-bo (서익보, 徐翼輔) of the Daegu Seo clan (대구 서씨, 大丘 徐氏)
 Younger sister - Lady Jo of the Pungyang Jo clan (본관: 풍양 조씨, 豊壤 趙氏)
 Brother-in-law - Yi Bok-yeon (이복연, 李復淵) of the Jeonju Yi clan (전주 이씨, 全州 李氏)
 Younger sister - Lady Jo of the Pungyang Jo clan (본관: 풍양 조씨, 豊壤 趙氏)
 Brother-in-law - Kim Byeong-mun (김병문, 金炳文) of the (new) Andong Kim clan (신 안동 김씨, 新 安東 金氏)
 Younger sister - Lady Jo of the Pungyang Jo clan (본관: 풍양 조씨, 豊壤 趙氏)
 Brother-in-law - Yun Gyeong-ryeol (윤경렬, 尹慶烈) of the Haepyeong Yun clan (해평 윤씨, 海平 尹氏)
 Younger sister - Lady Jo of the Pungyang Jo clan (본관: 풍양 조씨, 豊壤 趙氏)
 Brother-in-law - Yi Jae-mun (이재문, 李在文) of Yongin Yi clan (용인 이씨, 龍仁 李氏)
 Spouse
 Internal Princess Consort Deokan of the Eunjin Song clan (덕안부부인 송씨, 德安府夫人 宋氏) (1776 - 1834)
 Father-in-law - Song Si-yeon (송시연, 宋時淵)
 Mother-in-law - Lady Kim of the Andong Kim clan (안동 김씨, 安東 金氏)
 Children
 Son - Jo Byeong-gwi (조병귀, 趙秉龜)
 Adoptive grandson - Jo Seong-ha (조성하, 趙成夏); second son of Jo Byeong-joon (조병준, 趙秉駿) and grandson of Jo Won-yeong (조원영, 趙原永)
 Son - Jo Byeong-gu (조병구, 趙秉龜) (1801 - 1845)
 Daughter - Queen Shinjeong of the Pungyang Jo clan (신정왕후, 神貞王后) (21 January 1809 – 4 June 1890)
 Son-in-law - Yi Yeong, King Munjo (18 September 1809 - 25 June 1830) (이영 효명세자)
 Grandson - Yi Hwan, King Heonjong of Joseon (8 September 1827 – 25 July 1849) (조선 헌종)
 Granddaughter-in-law - Queen Hyohyeon of the Andong Kim clan (27 April 1828 - 18 October 1843) (효현왕후 김씨) — No issue.
 Granddaughter-in-law - Queen Hyojeong of the Namyang Hong clan (6 March 1831 – 2 January 1904) (효정왕후 홍씨) — No issue.
 Adoptive grandson - Yi Hui, Emperor Gojong of Korea (8 September 1852 - 21 January 1919) (광무태황제)
 Adoptive granddaughter-in-law - Min Ja-yeong, Empress Myeongseong of the Yeoheung Min clan (17 November 1851 - 8 October 1895) (명성태황후 민씨)
 Unnamed adoptive great-grandson (4 November 1871 – 8 November 1871)
 Unnamed adoptive great-granddaughter (13 February 1873 – 28 September 1873)
 Unnamed adoptive great-grandson - Yi Cheok, Emperor Sunjong of Korea (25 March 1874 – 24 April 1926)
 Unnamed adoptive great-grandson (5 April 1875 – 18 April 1875)
 Unnamed adoptive great-grandson (18 February 1878 – 5 June 1878)
 Son - Jo Byeong-gi ( 조병기, 趙秉夔) (1821 - 1858); became the adoptive son of his uncle Jo In-yeong (조인영, 趙寅永) (1782 - 1850)
 Adoptive grandson - Jo Yeong-ha (조영하, 趙寧夏) (June 1845 - 5 December 1884); second son of Jo Byeong-seok (조병석, 趙秉錫)
 Adoptive granddaughter-in-law - Lady Yi of the Yongin Yi clan (증 정경부인 용인 이씨); daughter of Yi Gyo-hyeon (이교현, 李敎鉉)
 Adoptive granddaughter-in-law - Yi Jeong-suk (이정숙, 李貞淑), Lady Yi of the Jeonju Yi clan (정경부인 전주 이씨); daughter of Yi Hae-seok (이해석, 李海錫) (1858 - 1935)
 Adoptive Great-Grandnephew - Jo Dong-yun (조동윤, 趙東潤) (1871 - 1923)
 Daughter - Lady Jo of the Pungyang Jo clan (본관: 풍양 조씨, 豊壤 趙氏)
 Son-in-law - Yi In-seol (이인설, 李寅卨) of the Jeonju Yi clan (본관: 전주 이씨, 全州 李氏)
 Daughter - Lady Jo of the Pungyang Jo clan (본관: 풍양 조씨, 豊壤 趙氏) (? - 1865)
 Son-in-law - Yu Chi-seon (유치선, 兪致善) of the Gigye Yu clan (본관: 기계 유씨, 杞溪 兪氏)
 Adoptive grandson - Yu Jin-hak (유진학); the maternal grandfather of Empress Sunjeong
 Daughter Lady Jo of the Pungyang Jo clan (본관: 풍양 조씨, 豊壤 趙氏)
 Son-in-law - Kim Seok-hyeon (김석현, 金奭鉉) of the Gwangsan Kim clan (본관: 광산 김씨, 光山 金氏)

References

External links
Jo Man-yeong on Encykorea .

1776 births
1846 deaths
Joseon scholar-officials
18th-century Korean people
19th-century Korean people
Pungyang Jo clan